, or Ainodake, is a peak of the Akaishi Mountains−Southern Alps, in Minami Alps National Park, Japan. At , it is the third tallest peak in Japan and the second highest in the Akaishi Mountains.

Its summit lies on the border of Aoi-ku and Shizuoka in Shizuoka Prefecture, and of Minami-Alps in Yamanashi Prefecture. Mount Aino is one of the landmark 100 Famous Japanese Mountains.

Location

East of the summit lies the cirque .

Geography
Mount Aino, like most of the Shiranesanzan, abounds with alpine plants. The neighborhood  is dominated by rocks where few plants can survive. It has been conceived that landslides around the summit have led to the growth of linear hollows. Taking into account such landslides, Mount Aino might have been dozens of metres higher in the past compared to its present altitude. It may have been Japan's tallest mountain during the Last Glacial Maximum. At that time, Mount Fuji had not reached its present height, and the second and third mountains (Mount Kita and Mount Hotaka) are presently only 4 and 1 metre taller, respectively.

Even though Mount Aino does not reach the height of Mount Kita, in its shape and dimension, it bears an equally great mass.

Mountain trails
Mount Aino lies on the traversal route between Mount Kita and Mount Nōtori. On the summit a trail forks towards  in the west, 
where it connects to the  traversal route.

Another
 is situated to the north on a saddle between Mount Aino and Mount Kita.

See also
 Minami Alps National Park
 Three-thousanders (in Japan)
 List of mountains and hills of Japan by height

Gallery

References

External links
Topographic map (1:25,000)

Akaishi Mountains
Mount Aino
Aino, Mount
Aino, Mount
Mount Aino